Peter Altmaier (born 18 June 1958) is a German lawyer and CDU politician who served as Acting Minister of Finance from 2017 to 2018 and as Federal Minister for Economic Affairs and Energy from 2018 to 2021. He previously served as Federal Minister for the Environment, Nature Conservation and Nuclear Safety from May 2012 to December 2013 and Head of the German Chancellery and as Federal Minister for Special Affairs from December 2013 to March 2018. Altmaier is widely seen as one of Chancellor Angela Merkel's most trusted advisors and advocates for her more centrist wing of the CDU. He is known for his "compromising style" and was described in 2017 as "the most powerful man in Berlin".

Peter Altmaier coined the German term "Altmaier-Delle", which describes the poor development of renewable energies in Germany during his time in office.

He represented Saarlouis in the Bundestag between 2009 and 2021.

Personal life and education 
Altmaier was born on 18 June 1958 in Ensdorf, Saarland. He is the son of a coal miner and a nurse. He studied law at Saarland University.

In addition to his native German, he also speaks English, Dutch and French. In 2012, Altmaier stated that he has always been a single person in his life, "so there can be nothing in the archives about a relationship".

Early career 
Altmaier began his career as a research assistant for public and international law at Saarland University in 1995 and later at the European Institute of Saarland University. His tenure lasted until 2000. He worked for the Directorate-General for Employment and Social Affairs of the European Commission from 1990 to 1994.

Political career
Altmaier has been a member of the CDU since 1976.

Member of the Bundestag, 1994–2021
Altmaier has been a member of the Bundestag since the 1994 national elections. He was elected in the constituency of Saarlouis. Between 1994 and 2002, he served on the Committee on Legal Affairs and the Committee on Affairs of the European Union, where he was his parliamentary group's rapporteur on matters related to the Charter of Fundamental Rights of the European Union.

When the Bundestag created a committee to examine whether then-Chancellor Gerhard Schröder and others in the governing SPD party inflated economic figures before the 2002 federal elections to hide a growing budget deficit, he was chosen by his parliamentary group to lead the inquiry.

From 2006 to 2011 Altmaier was president of Europa-Union Deutschland, the German section of the Union of European Federalists.

In the 2021 federal elections Altmaier lost his constituency to Heiko Maas, but still reentered the Bundestag through his party's list. However, on October 9, 2021, Altmaier resigned from the Bundestag together with Annegret Kramp-Karrenbauer in order to make room for younger people.

Parliamentary State Secretary, 2005–2009
Following the 2005 federal elections, Altmaier became Parliamentary State Secretary in the Federal Ministry of the Interior under Wolfgang Schäuble. In this capacity, he publicly admitted in 2009 that Germany followed a request of the government of Saudi Arabia it to grant influential cleric Abdullah Ibn Jibreen police protection in a Berlin hospital where he was undergoing heart treatment; the decision garnered sharp criticism from the opposition parties, with the Green Party questioning why Germany hosted someone who "has called for the killing of Shiites [and] praised Osama bin Laden."

In 2009, Altmaier was mentioned by international media as potential candidate for the office of European Commissioner.

Chief whip, 2009–2012
Succeeding Norbert Röttgen as parliamentary secretary (chief whip) of the CDU/CSU parliamentary group in the Bundestag following the 2009 elections, Altmaier was in charge of negotiating the passage of Eurozone crisis legislation through the parliament. He served as the government's chief negotiator with the opposition Social Democrats and Greens, as well as with potential rebels from the government benches.

In 2012, Altmaier also served as chairman of the Parliamentary Oversight Panel (PKGr), which provides parliamentary oversight of Germany's intelligence services BND, BfV and MAD.

Return to the Federal Government
On 22 May 2012, Altmaier replaced Norbert Röttgen as Federal Minister for the Environment, Nature Conservation and Nuclear Safety in the second Merkel cabinet.

While in office, Altmaier coordinated the government's efforts to exit nuclear power generation by 2022 and rely on more renewable sources such as wind and solar ("Energiewende"). He also demanded companies to harvest metals including rare earths from recycled electronics as Germany sought to become less dependent on imports from China and other nations. Together with his French counterpart Delphine Batho, he put in motion the establishment of the French-German Office for Renewable Energies (L'Office Franco-allemand pour les énergies renouvelables) in 2013.

In 2012, Altmaier led the German delegation to the 2012 United Nations Climate Change Conference in Doha.

In 2013, Altmaier and Economics Minister Philipp Rösler reached agreement on far-reaching regulations for the fracking industry.

Federal Minister, 2013–2021
In the negotiations to form a government following the 2013 federal elections, Altmaier led the CDU/CSU delegation in the energy working group; his co-chair from the SPD was Hannelore Kraft, Minister-President of North Rhine-Westphalia. In Angela Merkel's third Cabinet he serves as the Head of the Federal Chancellery and a Federal Minister for Special Affairs. In this capacity, he is also in charge of co-ordinating Germany's intelligence services.

In July 2015, Altmaier invited the United States Ambassador to Germany, John B. Emerson, to explain documents publicized by WikiLeaks that showed what appeared to be summaries of recorded conversations involving Chancellor Merkel or senior officials. Shortly after, WikiLeaks released additional documents including Altmaier's telephone number, adding to a growing pile of allegations that United States intelligence agencies conducted extensive surveillance of the German government.

In October 2015, Merkel put Altmaier in charge of coordinating Germany's response to the refugee crisis. From early 2017, he was a member of the German government's cabinet committee on Brexit at which ministers discussed organizational and structural issues related to the United Kingdom's departure from the European Union.

Following the 2017 elections, Altmaier became acting and temporary finance minister when Wolfgang Schäuble left office as Schäuble had agreed to become President of the Bundestag.

In January 2021 it was reported that Altmaier favoured "seizing control", possibly using Article 122 of the TFEU, "of the (COVID-19 vaccine) production process and ordering companies to manufacture vaccines at multiple sites."

Political positions

Domestic policy
Altmaier belongs to the more liberal wing of the CDU. In the 1990s, Altmaier advocated the rehabilitation of armed-forces deserters and explicitly criminalizing rape within marriage. He was integral to the Pizza Connection, a group of moderate CDU and Green Party politicians – including Hermann Gröhe, Armin Laschet and Cem Özdemir – who met at Sassella, an Italian restaurant in Bonn.

In June 2017, Altmaier voted in favor of Germany's introduction of same-sex marriage in a conscience vote, unlike the majority of the CDU/CSU (including Merkel herself).

Ahead of the Christian Democrats’ leadership election in 2018, Altmaier publicly endorsed Annegret Kramp-Karrenbauer to succeed Angela Merkel as the party's chair.

European politics
Responding to a growing unease over Germany's role in bailing out highly indebted European states, Altmaier in 2011 demanded that states that violate the EU's Stability and Growth Pact should be subject to the European Court of Justice. That same year, he advised against Germany pursuing a prompt debt haircut for Greece and warned of the consequences. According to Altmaier, the banks must be supported, in Greece and elsewhere, and the European Financial Stability Facility might have to issue guarantees for the holders of Italian and Spanish bonds, because they also fear that they will be asked to pay up.

Economic policy
In his position as Minister for Economic Affairs, Altmaier has become a figurehead for efforts to strengthen the European Union's defences against the encroachment of US and Asian technology and healthcare companies. In 2019 he wrote to European Commissioner Margrethe Vestager urging the commission to adopt a harder line on dominant online platforms such as Google and Facebook. Also in 2019, he presented plans to set up a standing government committee which, as a last resort, could decide to temporarily take stakes in German companies that produce sensitive or security relevant technologies. In 2020, he introduced legislation giving the government a right to veto hostile foreign takeover bids for healthcare companies, a measure designed to ensure a continuous supply of essential products during the COVID-19 pandemic in Germany.

Other activities (selection)

Regulatory agencies
 Stability Council, Ex-Officio Member (since 2017)
 Asian Infrastructure Investment Bank (AIIB), Ex-Officio Member of the Board of Governors (2017-2018)

Corporate boards
 RAG-Stiftung, Ex-Officio Member of the Board of Trustees (since 2017)
 KfW, Ex-Officio Member of the Board of Supervisory Directors (2013; since 2018)

Non-profit organizations
 Europa-Union Deutschland, President (2005–2009), Honorary President (since 2009)
 European Movement Germany, vice-president (2002–2009)
 German Institute for International and Security Affairs (SWP), Vice Chairman of the Council
 Migration Policy Institute (MPI), Member of the Transatlantic Council on Migration
 Institute for European Politics, Member of the Board of Trustees (2005–2009)
 ZDF, Ex-officio Member of the Television Board (2002–2005)

References

External links 

 Official website 
 Biography by German Bundestag 

|-

|-

|-

1958 births
Environment ministers of Germany
Finance ministers of Germany
Economy ministers of Germany
Jurists from Saarland
Federal government ministers of Germany
Heads of the German Chancellery
Living people
People from Saarlouis (district)
Saarland University alumni
Members of the Bundestag for Saarland
Members of the Bundestag for the Christian Democratic Union of Germany
Members of the Bundestag 2017–2021
Members of the Bundestag 2013–2017
Members of the Bundestag 2009–2013
Members of the Bundestag 2005–2009
Members of the Bundestag 2002–2005
Members of the Bundestag 1998–2002
Members of the Bundestag 1994–1998